Oren Kessler is an American political analyst, author and journalist.

Background and education

Kessler grew up in Rochester, New York, has a Bachelor of Arts degree in History from the University of Toronto and an Master of Arts in Government from Reichman University, Tel Aviv. He was formerly deputy director for research at the Foundation for Defense of Democracies in Washington, D.C.

Career
Kessler was Arab affairs correspondent for the Jerusalem Post, an editor, translator and writer for the English edition of Haaretz and a research fellow at the Henry Jackson Society think tank in London. His work has appeared in publications including The Wall Street Journal, Foreign Policy, Politico, The New Republic and Foreign Affairs.

He had corresponded extensively with fellow journalist Steven Sotloff in the months before Sotloff was murdered by ISIS militants in 2014. Sotloff wrote to Kessler in 2011 to introduce himself as a fellow former Reichman student. The two had both covered the Arab Spring, and, at the time Sotloff first contacted him, he was reporting from Libya while Kessler was covering the country for the Jerusalem Post. Kessler was also one of the journalists targeted by former CNN correspondent Jim Clancy in a 2015 Twitter incident that led to Clancy’s resignation.

Kessler is currently based in Tel Aviv. His book, Palestine 1936: The Great Revolt and the Roots of the Middle East Conflict, was published by Rowman & Littlefield in February 2023.

References

External links
 

Living people
Writers from Rochester, New York
University of Toronto alumni
Reichman University alumni
International relations scholars
American male journalists
Middle Eastern studies in the United States
Year of birth missing (living people)